France participated in the Eurovision Song Contest 2006 with the song with the song "Il était temps" written by Corneille Nyungura and Virginie Pouchain. The song was performed by Virginie Pouchain.

The French broadcaster France Télévisions in collaboration with the television channels France 2, France 3 and RFO organised the national final Et si c'était vous? in order to select the French entry for the 2006 contest in Athens, Greece. Singers interested in entering the French national final had the opportunity to apply to one of three open competitions with defined periods organised by France 2, France 3 and RFO. A total of 21 artists were selected; thirteen were selected from the France 3 selection and four were each selected from the France 2 and RFO selections. The 21 finalists competed in the national final on 14 March 2006 where the winner was selected over three rounds of voting. In the first round, the top ten candidates were selected by a four-member jury panel to advance to the second round. In the second round, the top three candidates were selected to advance to the final round following the combination of votes from the jury panel and a public vote, during which "Vous, c'est nous" performed by Virginie Pouchain was selected as the winner following the combination of votes from the jury and public vote. On 17 March 2006, France Télévisions announced that Pouchain would perform a new song at the Eurovision Song Contest and "Il était temps" was presented to the public as the new contest entry during a live performance by Pouchain on 10 April 2006 during the France 3 programme Questions pour un champion.

As a member of the "Big Four", France automatically qualified to compete in the final of the Eurovision Song Contest. Performing in position 19, France placed twenty-second out of the 24 participating countries with 5 points.

Background 

France first won the contest in 1958 with "Dors, mon amour" performed by André Claveau. In the 1960s, they won three times, with "Tom Pillibi" performed by Jacqueline Boyer in 1960, "Un premier amour" performed by Isabelle Aubret in 1962 and "Un jour, un enfant" performed by Frida Boccara, who won in 1969 in a four-way tie with the Netherlands, Spain and the United Kingdom. France's fifth victory came in 1977, when Marie Myriam won with the song "L'oiseau et l'enfant". France have also finished second four times, with Paule Desjardins in 1957, Catherine Ferry in 1976, Joëlle Ursull in 1990 and Amina in 1991, who lost out to Sweden's Carola in a tie-break. In the 21st century, France has had less success, only making the top ten two times, with Natasha St-Pier finishing fourth in 2001 and Sandrine François finishing fifth in 2002. In 2005, the nation finished in twenty-third place with the song "Chacun pense à soi" performed by Ortal.

The French national broadcaster, France Télévisions, broadcasts the event within France and delegates the selection of the nation's entry to the television channel France 3. France 3 confirmed that France would participate in the 2006 Eurovision Song Contest on 11 December 2005. The French broadcaster had used both national finals and internal selection to choose the French entry in the past. From 2001 to 2004, the broadcaster opted to internally select the French entry. The 2005 French entry was selected via a national final, a procedure that was continued in order to select the 2006 entry.

Before Eurovision

Et si c'était vous? 
Et si c'était vous? was the national final organised by France Télévisions in collaboration with three broadcaster channels: France 2, France 3 and overseas territories broadcaster RFO to select France's entry for the Eurovision Song Contest 2006. The competition took place on 14 March 2006 at the La Plaine St-Denis TV Studios in Paris, hosted by Michel Drucker and Claudy Siar. The show was broadcast on France 3 as well as online via the broadcaster channel's official website france3.fr. The national final was watched by 3.4 million viewers in France with a market share of 18.5%.

Format 
The selection process took place in two stages before the 21 selected finalists for the live final and ultimately the winner were selected. The first stage of the competition included France 2, France 3 and RFO each conducting varying selections in order to determine the candidates they submitted for the second stage of the competition. France 3 submitted thirteen candidates while France 2 and RFO each submitted four candidates. The 21 candidates proceeded to the second stage, the televised national final, where the winning artist was selected as the French entrant for the Eurovision Song Contest 2006 and would perform an internally selected song written by Canadian singer-songwriter Corneille Nyungura.

France 2 selection 
The four candidates selected by France 2 for the national final were determined through the France 2 programme Entrée des Artistes, produced and hosted by Pascal Sevran. Eighteen contestants were selected for the competition from over 500 performers that attended auditions held in Lille, Marseille and Paris between 2 December 2005 and 13 December 2005. Following two heats on 14 and 21 January 2006 and a semi-final on 28 January 2006, six contestants ultimately qualified to compete in the final on 4 February 2006, from which four were selected exclusively by public televoting to advance to the national final and announced during an additional show on 4 March 2006.

France 3 selection 
The thirteen candidates selected by France 3 for the national final were determined through auditions held in thirteen cities across France between 16 January 2006 and 3 February 2006, where over 3,000 performers attended. From each audition, ten performers were selected to advance to the second round and the public was able to vote online via france3.fr. The winner of each audition was determined by the combination of the online vote (50%) and a jury panel headed by vocal coach Malika Bellari (50%) and announced between 9 and 14 February 2006.

RFO selection 
The four candidates selected by RFO for the national final were determined through the musical programme 9 Semaines et 1 Jour which featured 93 artists from French overseas territories. Nine artists ultimately qualified to compete in the final round, from which four were selected to advance to the national final by the combination of an online vote (1/3) and a jury panel (2/3) and announced on 7 February 2006. For the online vote, the public was able to vote for their favourite artists via the programme website 9s1j.rfo.fr between 30 January and 5 February 2006.

National final 
The national final took place on 14 March 2006 and the winner was selected over three rounds of voting. In the first round, the twenty-one finalists performed cover versions of popular songs in groups and the top ten contestants as determined by a four-member Francophone jury panel advanced to the second round. In the second round, the remaining ten contestants together performed a medley of English language songs: "Y.M.C.A." by Village People, "Rasputin" by Boney M., "Ring My Bell" by Anita Ward and "Lady Marmalade" by Patti LaBelle, and the top three contestants as determined by the combination of public voting (50%) and the four-member jury (50%) advanced to the final round: Virginie Pouchain, Fabien Incardona and Julien Lamassone. Viewers were able to vote via telephone, SMS and online voting. In the final round, each of the remaining three contestants performed a cover version of an assigned French language song and the winner, Virginie Pouchain, was determined by the public and jury vote.

The jury panel that evaluated the contestants during the show consisted of:

Charles Aznavour – Singer-songwriter
Lara Fabian – Canadian singer-songwriter, represented Luxembourg in the 1988 contest
Natasha St-Pier – Canadian singer, represented France in the 2001 contest
Pierre Gage – Singer

In addition to the performances of the contestants, Corneille Nyungura and jury members Lara Fabian and Natasha St-Pier performed as the interval acts of the show. The French contest entry, "Vous, c'est nous", was also presented to the public during the show.

Song selection 
Following Virginie Pouchain's win at the French national final, the singer stated that she would be performing a song other than "Vous, c'est nous" at the Eurovision Song Contest following consultation with composer Corneille Nyungura as the entry, originally written to be performed by a male vocalist, did not suit her style. After being given an extended deadline by the EBU, the replacement entry "Il était temps" was formally presented to the public on 10 April 2006 during the France 3 programme Questions pour un champion, hosted by Julien Lepers.

At Eurovision 
According to Eurovision rules, all nations with the exceptions of the host country, the "Big Four" (France, Germany, Spain and the United Kingdom) and the ten highest placed finishers in the 2005 contest are required to qualify from the semi-final in order to compete for the final; the top ten countries from the semi-final progress to the final. As a member of the "Big 4", France automatically qualified to compete in the final on 20 May 2006. In addition to their participation in the final, France is also required to broadcast and vote in the semi-final on 18 May 2006. During the running order draw for the semi-final and final on 21 March 2006, France was placed to perform in position 19 in the final, following the entry from Ukraine and before the entry from Croatia. Virginie Pouchain performed the song on stage together with cellist Matheson Bayley and France placed twenty-second in the final, scoring 5 points.

In France, the semi-final was broadcast on France 4 with commentary by Peggy Olmi and Éric Jean-Jean, while the final was broadcast on France 3 with commentary by Michel Drucker and Claudy Siar, as well as via radio on France Bleu with commentary by Alexandre Devoise. The French spokesperson, who announced the French votes during the final, was Sophie Jovillard.

Voting 
Below is a breakdown of points awarded to France and awarded by France in the semi-final and grand final of the contest. The nation awarded its 12 points to Armenia in the semi-final and to Turkey in the final of the contest.

Points awarded to France

Points awarded by France

References

External links
French National Final page

2006
Countries in the Eurovision Song Contest 2006
Eurovision
Eurovision